Sambaram (English Translation: Celebration) is a 2003 Indian Telugu-language drama film starring Nithiin and Nikitha in lead roles and directed by Kondapalli Dasaradh Kumar.

Plot 
Ravi (Nithiin) and Geeta (Nikitha) are childhood friends. Ravi is a carefree guy who roams around with friends without concentrating on studies. Geeta is a sincere student who passes engineering studies. Ravi has feelings for her and everybody in the town is aware of it except for Geeta. When she is asked by Nitin's sister-in-law Seeta when she is planning to marry Ravi, she expresses her surprise and says that they are just friends and she has no feelings for him. She shows her materialistic attitude by saying that she wants her husband to be financially and academically stronger than her. Ravi is devastated after listening to her logic. He realizes the importance of being a responsible family member and work as a mechanic to earn money. He becomes proficient in his work and finally gets the visa to work in Dubai. He wants to leave for Dubai as it gives him an opportunity to prove his money-earning ability despite being away from Geeta. Meanwhile, Geeta's father dies and she starts realizing that it takes more than academics and finances to make a man qualified to be a husband. And by that time Ravi is already at the airport. When Geeta learns about Ravi going to Dubai for a job, she realizes her love for him and rushes to the airport to stop him. Finally, Geeta proposes to Ravi and they happily get married.

Cast

Nithiin as Ravi
Nikitha as Geeta
Paruchuri Gopala Krishna as Ravi's father
Banerjee as Ravi's brother
Seeta as Ravi's sister-in-law
Giri Babu as Geeta's father
S. V. Krishna Reddy as Lecturer
M. S. Narayana
Duvvasi Mohan
Rallapalli
Venu Madhav
Rajesh
Nikhil Siddharth

Soundtrack
The music was composed by R. P. Patnaik.

Reception 
The Hindu opined that the director "fails to deliver a happy, engrossing subject".

References

External links
 

2003 films
2000s Telugu-language films